Haroun Korjie (born 18 February 1972) is a Sierra Leonean former sprinter. He competed in the men's 4 × 400 metres relay at the 1996 Summer Olympics.

References

1972 births
Living people
Athletes (track and field) at the 1996 Summer Olympics
Sierra Leonean male sprinters
Olympic athletes of Sierra Leone
Place of birth missing (living people)